Associação Chapecoense de Futebol, commonly known as Chapecoense, is a Brazilian football club, based in the city of Chapecó in the state of Santa Catarina.

The club was founded in 1973 with the goal of restoring football in the city, and won the state championship, the Campeonato Catarinense, for the first time in 1977. The club has won six state titles to date, most recently in 2017. A relatively small club, it entered Brazil's top division, Série A, for the first time in 1978, returning to the top flight only in 2014. The club also has activities in futsal, in which it has been state champion twice. The club's home matches are played at Arena Condá.

On 28 November 2016, a charter flight carrying the first team crashed as it approached José María Córdova International Airport near Medellín, Colombia, where the team was travelling to play the first leg of the 2016 Copa Sudamericana final against Atlético Nacional, a match that was seen as the biggest in the history of the club. All but six of the 77 passengers died; only three Chapecoense players survived their injuries. Following the crash, Atlético Nacional made a request to the governing body of the competition, CONMEBOL, that Chapecoense be awarded the trophy. CONMEBOL awarded Chapecoense the trophy on 5 December, and Atlético Nacional received the Centennial Fair Play Award for their gesture.

History
The club was founded as Associação Chapecoense de Futebol on 10 May 1973, after the merger of Atlético Chapecoense and Independente.

In 1977, Chapecoense won its first title, which was the Campeonato Catarinense, beating Avaí 1–0 in the final.

In 1978, the club competed for the first time in the Campeonato Brasileiro, finishing in the 51st position, and in following year, finished in the 93rd position.

In 2002, due to a partnership, Chapecoense was renamed to Associação Chapecoense Kindermann/Mastervet. In 2006, the club went back to its original name, Associação Chapecoense de Futebol, and also won the Copa Santa Catarina. In 2007, the club won the state championship for the third time, and also competed in the Brazilian Championship Third Level, but was eliminated in the first stage of the competition. They won the Campeonato Catarinense again in 2011 and 2016.

Chapecoense competed in the Série A for the first time since 1979 in 2014, as the club was promoted after they and Bragantino drew 1–1, in Chapecó, for the 2013 Série B. Winning important points during its first season in the top flight, Chape cemented a place in the 2015 Série A, its second season in a row in the first division.

In 2016, Chapecoense made history when they reached the finals of the Copa Sudamericana, South America's secondary club football tournament, after defeating San Lorenzo de Almagro using the away goals rule. They were awarded the title following LaMia Flight 2933, a disastrous plane crash which killed the majority of their squad on the way to the final (see below)

As Copa Sudamericana champions, Chapecoense qualified for the 2017 Copa Libertadores, their first appearance in that tournament. With a squad built up from loan players, free signings and promoted youth players, as well as two survivors of the crash, they won their first match in an away game at Zulia of Venezuela.

On 27 November 2019, almost three years to the day from the devastating plane crash, the club suffered relegation from the Série A following a 0–1 loss to Botafogo.

On 12 January 2021, a year after being relegated, they were promoted back to the Série A following a 2-1 victory against state rivals Figueirense.

2016 plane crash

On the evening of 28 November 2016, LaMia Flight 2933, carrying 77 people, including the staff and players from the club, crashed as it approached Medellín, Colombia; 71 people died (including 21 journalists and almost the entire first team and managerial staff) and 6 survived, according to the BBC. The surviving players were left-back Alan Ruschel, backup goalkeeper Jakson Follmann (who had one of his legs amputated due to his injuries and was forced to retire from professional football), and center-back Neto. Goalkeeper Danilo initially survived the crash, but later died before arriving to the hospital.  Chapecoense goalkeeper Nivaldo, who did not board the flight, soon after announced his immediate retirement from football. There was a lot of anger among the fans of Chapecoense after it was confirmed that LaMia Airlines Flight 2933 ran out of fuel after leaked footage confirmed that the pilot requested to land due to fuel problems but was instructed to wait 7 minutes as another aircraft was having fuel leakage problems and had already requested priority landing. The government of Bolivia has suspended LaMia Airlines's flying license after it surfaced that the pilot skipped a crucial refuelling stop.

Due to the crash, the 2016 Copa Sudamericana Finals in which the team were due to play was suspended indefinitely. Their opponents, Atlético Nacional, offered to concede the tie to allow Chapecoense to be awarded the championship. On 4 December 2016, Chapecoense's interim president announced that CONMEBOL would be granting the club the tournament title and prize money. While initially other Brazilian clubs offered to loan out players to them for free and sent a request to the Brazilian FA stating that the club should be immune from relegation for three years, Chapecoense rejected this assistance, stating that they wanted to rebuild properly.

Chapecoense were asked to fulfill their next league fixture in tribute to the players and staff who died in a plane crash. Chapecoense President Ivan Tozzo revealed that the Brazilian FA had asked for the club to play their final league game of the 2016 campaign in part by drawing on their Under-20s side to fill out the roster. However, both Chapecoense and their opponents Atlético Mineiro refused to play. Both teams were awarded a 3–0 loss for the game.

Deceased Chapecoense players

 Ailton Cesar Junior Alves da Silva (Canela), 22
 Dener Assunção Braz (Dener), 25
 Marcelo Augusto Mathias da Silva (Marcelo), 25
 Matheus Bitencourt da Silva (Matheus Biteco), 21
 Mateus Lucena dos Santos (Caramelo), 22
 Guilherme Gimenez de Souza (Gimenez), 21
 Lucas Gomes da Silva (Lucas Gomes), 26
 Everton Kempes dos Santos Gonçalves (Kempes), 34
 Arthur Brasiliano Maia (Arthur Maia), 24
 Ananias Eloi Castro Monteiro (Ananias), 27
 Marcos Danilo Padilha (Danilo), 31
 Filipe José Machado (Filipe Machado), 32
 Sérgio Manoel Barbosa Santos (Sérgio Manoel), 27
 José Gildeixon Clemente de Paiva (Gil), 29
 Bruno Rangel Domingues (Bruno Rangel), 34
 Cléber Santana Loureiro (Cléber Santana), 35
 Josimar Rosado da Silva Tavares (Josimar), 30
 Willian Thiego de Jesus (Thiego), 30
 Tiago da Rocha Vieira Alves (Tiaguinho), 22

Deceased Chapecoense staff

 Luiz Carlos Saroli (Caio Júnior), coach, 51

Current squad

Out on loan

Sponsors
As of 2016, the sponsors are English company Umbro, the kit supplier; Caixa Econômica Federal, a state-owned Brazilian bank; Unimed, a Brazilian health insurance company; and Aurora Alimentos, a food processing company from Chapecó.

Honours

National 
 Série B: 1
 2020

International 
 Copa Sudamericana: 1
2016

Regional
Campeonato Catarinense: 7
1977, 1996, 2007, 2011, 2016, 2017, 2020

Copa Santa Catarina: 1
2006

Taça Santa Catarina: 2
1979, 2014

Taça Plinio Arlindo De Nes: 1
1995

Campeonato Seletivo: 1
2002

Copa da Paz: 1
2005

Season records

{|class="wikitable"
|-bgcolor="#efefef"
! Season
! Div.
! Pos.
! Pl.
! W
! D
! L
! GS
! GA
! Pts.
! style="width:15%;"|Copa do Brasil
!colspan=2|CONMEBOL

|-
|align=center|1978
|align=center rowspan="1"|Série A
|align=center|51
|align=center|18
|align=center|5
|align=center|5
|align=center|8
|align=center|13
|align=center|22
|align=center|15
|align=center|–
|align=center colspan="2"|DNP

|-
|align=center|1979
|align=center rowspan="1"|Série A
|align=center|93
|align=center|9
|align=center|0
|align=center|3
|align=center|6
|align=center|6
|align=center|16
|align=center|3
|align=center|–
|align=center colspan="2"|DNP

|-
|align=center|1980
|align=center rowspan="1"|Série B
|align=center|64
|align=center|7
|align=center|0
|align=center|1
|align=center|6
|align=center|2
|align=center|13
|align=center|1
|align=center|–
|align=center colspan="2"|DNP

|-
|align=center|1987
|align=center rowspan="1"|Série C
|align=center|9
|align=center|8
|align=center|2
|align=center|5
|align=center|1
|align=center|8
|align=center|7
|align=center|9
|align=center|–
|align=center colspan="2"|DNP

|-
|align=center|1992
|align=center rowspan="1"|Série C
|align=center|13
|align=center|6
|align=center|3
|align=center|1
|align=center|2
|align=center|9
|align=center|8
|align=center|7
|align=center|DNP
|align=center colspan="2"|DNP

|-
|align=center|1995
|align=center rowspan="1"|Série C
|align=center|27
|align=center|8
|align=center|3
|align=center|3
|align=center|2
|align=center|9
|align=center|8
|align=center|12
|align=center|DNP
|align=center colspan="2"|DNP

|-
|align=center|1996
|align=center rowspan="1"|Série C
|align=center|39
|align=center|6
|align=center|3
|align=center|0
|align=center|3
|align=center|6
|align=center|9
|align=center|9
|align=center|DNP
|align=center colspan="2"|DNP

|-
|align=center|1997
|align=center rowspan="1"|Série C
|align=center|40
|align=center|6
|align=center|2
|align=center|1
|align=center|3
|align=center|3
|align=center|4
|align=center|7
|align=center|DNP
|align=center colspan="2"|DNP

|-
|align=center|1998
|align=center rowspan="1"|Série C
|align=center|58
|align=center|10
|align=center|1
|align=center|3
|align=center|6
|align=center|11
|align=center|26
|align=center|6
|align=center|DNP
|align=center colspan="2"|DNP

|-
|align=center|2007
|align=center rowspan="1"|Série C
|align=center|54
|align=center|6
|align=center|1
|align=center|1
|align=center|4
|align=center|5
|align=center|10
|align=center|4
|align=center|DNP
|align=center colspan="2"|DNP

|-
|align=center|2008
|align=center colspan="9"|DNP
|align=center|Second round
|align=center colspan="2"|DNP

|-
|align=center|2009
|align=center rowspan="1"|Série D
|align=center bgcolor="#a67d3d"|3
|align=center|14
|align=center|8
|align=center|3
|align=center|3
|align=center|24
|align=center|13
|align=center|27
|align=center|DNP
|align=center colspan="2"|DNP

|-
|align=center|2010
|align=center rowspan="1"|Série C
|align=center|7
|align=center|10
|align=center|3
|align=center|4
|align=center|3
|align=center|10
|align=center|10
|align=center|16
|align=center|Second round
|align=center colspan="2"|DNP

|-
|align=center|2011
|align=center rowspan="1"|Série C
|align=center|6
|align=center|14
|align=center|6
|align=center|3
|align=center|5
|align=center|25
|align=center|19
|align=center|21
|align=center|DNP
|align=center colspan="2"|DNP

|-
|align=center|2012
|align=center rowspan="1"|Série C
|align=center bgcolor="#a67d3d"|3
|align=center|22
|align=center|9
|align=center|6
|align=center|7
|align=center|27
|align=center|14
|align=center|33
|align=center|Second round
|align=center colspan="2"|DNP

|-
|align=center|2013
|align=center rowspan="1"|Série B
|align=center bgcolor="silver"|2
|align=center|38
|align=center|20
|align=center|12
|align=center|6
|align=center|60
|align=center|31
|align=center|72
|align=center|DNP
|align=center colspan="2"|DNP

|-
|align=center|2014
|align=center rowspan="1"|Série A
|align=center|15
|align=center|38
|align=center|11
|align=center|10
|align=center|17
|align=center|39
|align=center|44
|align=center|43
|align=center|Second round
|align=center colspan="2"|DNP

|-
|align=center|2015
|align=center rowspan="1"|Série A
|align=center|14
|align=center|38
|align=center|12
|align=center|11
|align=center|15
|align=center|34
|align=center|44
|align=center|47
|align=center|Second round
|align=center|CS
|align=center|Quarterfinals

|-
|align=center|2016
|align=center rowspan="1"|Série A
|align=center|11
|align=center|38
|align=center|13
|align=center|13
|align=center|12
|align=center|49
|align=center|53
|align=center|52
|align=center|Round of 32
|align=center|CS
|align=center bgcolor="gold"|Champions

|-
|align=center rowspan="2"|2017
|align=center rowspan="2"|Série A
|align=center rowspan="2"|8
|align=center rowspan="2"|38
|align=center rowspan="2"|15
|align=center rowspan="2"|9
|align=center rowspan="2"|14
|align=center rowspan="2"|47
|align=center rowspan="2"|49
|align=center rowspan="2"|54
|align=center rowspan="2"|Round of 16
|align=center|CL
|align=center |Group stage
|-
|align=center|CS
|align=center|Round of 16

|-
|align=center|2018
|align=center|Série A
|align=center|14
|align=center|38
|align=center|11
|align=center|11
|align=center|16
|align=center|34
|align=center|50
|align=center|44
|align=center|Quarterfinals
|align=center|CL
|align=center|Second stage
|-

|align=center|2019
|align=center|Série A
|align=center|19
|align=center|38
|align=center|7
|align=center|11
|align=center|20
|align=center|31
|align=center|52
|align=center|32
|align=center|Fourth round
|align=center|CS
|align=center|First stage
|-

|align=center|2020
|align=center|Série B
|align=center bgcolor="gold"|1
|align=center|38
|align=center|20
|align=center|13
|align=center|5
|align=center|42
|align=center|21
|align=center|73
|align=center|Second round
|align=center colspan="2"|DNP
|-

|align=center|2021
|align=center|Série A
|align=center|20
|align=center|38
|align=center|1
|align=center|12
|align=center|25
|align=center|27
|align=center|67
|align=center|15
|align=center|Third round
|align=center colspan="2"|DNP
|-
|}

References

External links

 

 
Association football clubs established in 1973
Football clubs in Santa Catarina (state)
1973 establishments in Brazil
C